Lucebert (Lubertus Jacobus Swaanswijk; 15 September 1924 – 10 May 1994) was a Dutch artist who first became known as the poet of the COBRA movement.

He was born in Amsterdam in 1924. He entered the Institute for Arts and Crafts in 1938 and took part in the first exhibition of the COBRA group at the Stedelijk Museum, Amsterdam in 1949.

Biography
Lucebert's talent was discovered when he started working for his father after school. After half a year of art school, he chose to be homeless between 1938 and 1947. In 1947, a Franciscan convent offered him a roof over his head, in exchange for a huge mural painting. Because the nuns could not appreciate his work, they had it entirely painted over with white paint.

He belonged to the Dutch literary movement of De Vijftigers, which was greatly influenced by the European avant-garde movement COBRA. Lucebert's early work  especially shows this influence, and his art in general reflects a rather pessimistic outlook on life.

His strong personality appealed to many. As a poet he laid foundation for revolutionary innovation in Dutch poetry.

Most of his poems were collected in Gedichten 1948–1965. After this period of composing poetry, he worked primarily in the visual arts known as figurative-expressionist from the 1960s. His work is being translated to English on collected works.

Well known is his line "" from the poem  ("The very old one sings"). The adjective "weerloos" means "defenseless", "unable to defend oneself", so the meaning is "All things of value are defenseless". This line was put on top of the office building of an insurance company in Rotterdam (near the Blaak station) in neon letters, including his name, sometime in the 1980s or earlier. It wasn't the first but is certainly the most prominent commercial use of the line; today three more buildings in the area display it on their walls. Similarly, written on the city's central library just across the street is " – Erasmus", "All the world is my fatherland – Erasmus".

Lucebert died on 10 May 1994 in Alkmaar, Netherlands.

Lucebert was also a noted anti-apartheid activist.

Exhibitions
 1949 – International Exhibition of Experimental Art, Stedelijk Museum, Amsterdam, Netherlands
 1959 – Stedelijk Museum, Amsterdam, Netherlands
 1961 – Stedelijk van Abbe-Museum, Eindhoven, Netherlands
 1963 – Staedtlische Kunstgalerie, Bochum, Germany
 1963 – Marlborough New London Gallery, London
 1964 – Museum Boymans-van Beuningen, Rotterdam; Kunsthalle Baden-Baden
 1964 – Documenta 111, Kassel, Germany
 1969 – Stedelijk Museum, Amsterdam
 1969 – Kunsthalle Basel, Switzerland – with Karel Appel and Tajiri
 1977 – Stedelijk Museum, Amsterdam, Netherlands
 1982 – Kunsthalle, Mannheim, Germany
 1983 – Kunstverein Hochrhein, Bad Säckingen, Germany
 1984 – Stedelijk Museum, Amsterdam, Netherlands
 1985 – Rai, Kunstmesse Amsterdam, Netherlands
 1987 – Stedelijk Museum, Amsterdam, Netherlands
 1988 – Kunstmuseum Winterthur, Kunstverein Freiburg i.Br., Germany
 1988 – Landesmuseum Oldenburg, Galerie im Taxispalais, Innsbruck, Austria
 1989 – Kunsthalle zu Kiel, Germany
 1989 – Städtische Kunstgalerie, Bochum, Germany
 1989 – Kunsthaus Grenchen, Grenchen, Switzerland

Awards
 1954 – prize for literature from the city of Amsterdam
 1959 – "Mediterranean Prize" of the Paris Biennale
 1962 – 2nd "Marzotto Prize"
 1964 – "Carlo Cardazzo" prize at the 32nd Biennale in Venice, Italy
 1965 – "Constantijn Huygensprijs"
 1967 – "P.C. Hooftprijs" – the highest Dutch Governmental prize for literature
 1983 – "Prijs der Nederlandse Letteren" for Dutch literature

Public collections
Among the public collections holding works by Lucebert Swaanswijk are:
 Museum de Fundatie, Zwolle

Notes

External links

1924 births
1994 deaths
Dutch male poets
Writers from Amsterdam
Painters from Amsterdam
Constantijn Huygens Prize winners
P. C. Hooft Award winners
Prijs der Nederlandse Letteren winners
20th-century Dutch painters
Dutch male painters
Abstract painters
Dutch watercolourists
Dutch lithographers
Pseudonymous artists
20th-century Dutch poets
20th-century Dutch male writers
20th-century Dutch male artists
20th-century lithographers